Pollucite is a zeolite mineral with the formula  with iron, calcium, rubidium and potassium as common substituting elements. It is important as a significant ore of caesium and sometimes rubidium. It forms a solid solution series with analcime. It crystallizes in the isometric - hexoctahedral crystal system as colorless, white, gray, or rarely pink and blue masses. Well formed crystals are rare. It has a Mohs hardness of 6.5 and a specific gravity of 2.9. It has a brittle fracture and no cleavage.

Discovery and occurrence

It was first described by August Breithaupt in 1846 for occurrences on the island of Elba, Italy. It is named for Pollux, the twin of Castor on the grounds that it is often found associated with petalite (previously known as castorite). The high caesium content was missed by the first analysis by Karl Friedrich Plattner in 1848, but after the discovery of caesium in 1860 a second analysis in 1864 was able to show the high caesium content of pollucite.

Its typical occurrence is in lithium-rich granite pegmatites in 
association with quartz, spodumene, petalite, amblygonite, lepidolite, elbaite, cassiterite, columbite, apatite, eucryptite, muscovite, albite and microcline.

About 82% of the world's known reserves of pollucite occur near Bernic Lake in Manitoba, Canada, where they are mined for their caesium content for use in caesium formate oil drilling assistance. This ore is about 20% by weight caesium.

References

 

Caesium minerals
Sodium minerals
Aluminium minerals
Zeolites
Cubic minerals
Minerals in space group 230
Luminescent minerals